The 1925 season is the Hawthorn Football Club's first season in the Victorian Football League and 24th overall. The club was allowed entry to join the VFL crossing over from the Victorian Football Association. Alex Hall was the first coach for the VFL team while Jim Jackson was the first captain.

The club finished 3–14 in their first season which placed them 12th and last on the ladder, receiving the wooden spoon.

Hawthorn's best and fairest was awarded to Fred Finch while Les Woodford was the leading goalkicker with twenty goals for the season.

Roster

Season summary
In the opening game, they scored the first VFL goal from Hec Yeomans as they would lose by 39 points. It would not be until Round 5, that Hawthorn would record their first victory in the VFL as Les Woodford scored three goals in a sixteen point victory over fellow newcomers  who was missing seven players from the previous week. The following week would see Hawthorn give up a seventeen point lead at the half time break to lose by four points at Arden Street Oval to North Melbourne.

They evently finish with the wooden-spoon with a third win in the final match of the season against North Melbourne at home in what was their biggest win of the season (25 points).

Results

Ladder

References

Hawthorn Football Club seasons